Clinton Island is an island in Chemung County, New York. It is located in Elmira, on the Chemung River.

References

River islands of New York (state)
Landforms of Chemung County, New York
Islands of New York (state)